Rice County may refer to:

 Rice County, Kansas, U.S.
 Rice County, Minnesota, U.S.